Tomohito is a masculine Japanese given name.

Possible writings
Tomohito can be written using different combinations of kanji characters. Some examples:

友仁, "friend, humanity"
友人, "friend, person"
知仁, "know, humanity"
知人, "know, person"
智仁, "intellect, humanity"
智人, "intellect, person"
共仁, "together, humanity"
共人, "together, person"
朋仁, "companion, humanity"
朋人, "companion, person"
朝仁, "morning/dynasty, humanity"
朝人, "morning/dynasty, person"

The name can also be written in hiragana ともひと or katakana トモヒト.

Notable people with the name
, Emperor of Japan
, Japanese baseball player
, Japanese video game composer
, Japanese baseball player
, Japanese prince
, Japanese footballer
, Japanese baseball player

Japanese masculine given names